Regis Catholic Middle School is a Catholic school in Cedar Rapids, Iowa, located at 735 Prairie Drive NE. It opened in the year 2000.

Formerly a Catholic high school opened in 1958 as a successor to Immaculate Conception High School, it drew students from the parishes of All Saints, Immaculate Conception, St. Joseph (Marion), St. Matthew, St. Pius X, and St. Wenceslaus. That school merged with LaSalle High School to form Xavier High School in 1998.

Notable alumni
 Kurt Warner ('89), NFL quarterback, 1999 Super Bowl MVP 
 Zach Johnson ('94) PGA Tour golfer

References

Defunct schools in Iowa
Defunct Catholic secondary schools in Iowa
Educational institutions established in 1958
Educational institutions disestablished in 1998
Schools in Cedar Rapids, Iowa
1958 establishments in Iowa
1998 disestablishments in Iowa